Clusiidae or "druid flies" is a family of small (~ 3.5 mm), thin, yellow to black acalyptrate flies with a characteristic antenna (The second segment of the antennae has a triangular projection over the third segment when viewed from the outside) and with the wing usually partially infuscated. They have a cylindrical body. The head is round, the vertical plate reaches the anterior margin of the frons and the vibrissae on the head are large. The costa is interrupted near subcosta and the latter developed throughout length. Larvae are found in the bark of trees, the flies on trunks. The larvae are notable for their ability to jump. Males of many species in the subfamily Clusiodinae have been observed while engaged in lekking behaviour. There are hundreds of species in 14 genera found in all the Ecoregions, although most species occur in tropical regions. The type genus is Clusia Haliday, 1838.

Genera
Subfamily Clusiinae Frey, 1960
Clusia Haliday, 1838.
Melanoclusia Lonsdale & Marshall, 2008
Phylloclusia Hendel, 1913
Tetrameringia McAlpine, 1960

Subfamily Clusiodinae Frey, 1960
Allometopon Kertész, 1906
Clusiodes Coquillett, 1904.
Czernyola Bezzi, 1907
Electroclusiodes† Hennig, 1965
Hendelia Czerny, 1903
Heteromeringia Czerny, 1903
Subfamily Sobarocephalinae Lonsdale & Marshall, 2006
Apiochaeta Czerny, 1903
Chaetoclusia Coquillett, 1904.
Procerosoma Lonsdale & Marshall, 2006
Sobarocephala Czerny, 1903

Identification
Lonsdale, O., Cheung, D.K.B. & Marshall, S.A. 2011. Key to the World genera and North American species of Clusiidae (Diptera: Schizophora). Canadian Journal of Arthropod Identification No. 14, 3 May 2011, available online at http://www.biology.ualberta.ca/bsc/ejournal/lcm_14/lcm_14.html, doi: 10.3752/cjai.2011.14

References

External links

Tree of Life  An expert up to date account.
BugGuide Images
Diptera.info Images
Delta-Intkey
Key to World genera and North America species

Species lists
West Palaearctic including Russia
Nearctic
Australasian and Oceanian
Japan

 
Brachycera families
Articles containing video clips